Semiluki is a rural locality (a selo) and the administrative center of Semilukskoye Rural Settlement, Semiluksky District, Voronezh Oblast, Russia. The population was 2,406 as of 2010. There are 47 streets.

Geography 
It is located 5 km north of Semiluki (the district's administrative centre) by road.

References 

Rural localities in Semiluksky District